The Diocese of Montreal is a diocese of the Ecclesiastical Province of Canada of the Anglican Church of Canada, in turn a province of the Anglican Communion.  The diocese comprises the  encompassing the City and Island of Montreal, the Laurentians, the South Shore opposite Montreal, and part of the Eastern Townships.  The See city is Montreal, and the cathedral is Christ Church. The diocese maintains approximately 9,000 on its parish rolls in about seventy parishes.

History
The diocese was established in 1850, having been carved off from the Diocese of Quebec (where there was a suffragan bishop of Montreal from 1836). The first synod was organised nine years later.  Its first bishop, Francis Fulford, was influenced by the Oxford Movement.

In 1866, there was one archdeaconry: J. Scott was Archdeacon of Montreal.

Present status
While Montreal was the largest Canadian city and the centre of commerce in the country, the diocese thrived.  In recent decades, however, as these attributes have shifted to Toronto, the English-Canadian population in the diocese has shrunk dramatically, forcing the merger and the closure of parishes.  The diocese's original membership of 25,000 150 years ago has shrunk by over one-third, even as the total population in the civil region has expanded from about 70,000 to over 3,000,000—a 9000% decrease in its proportional importance.  The diocese's decline thus far exceeds Montreal's relative loss of prestige to Toronto.

With both the dioceses of Montreal and Quebec now having less than 10,000 members, and decreasing membership, discussions are underway for the eventual merger of the two fading dioceses, beginning with an exploration of opportunities for combined administration.

Today, like the Anglican Church of Canada generally, liberal theology dominates, with the bishop approving a form for blessings for same-sex unions in 2010.

The present bishop is Mary Irwin-Gibson.

Parish list

Estrie

Memphrémagog Regional County Municipality
 St Paul's Anglican Church, Masonville, Potton

Island of Montreal
 All Saints by the Lake, Dorval
 Anglican Church of St Peter and St Mark, Saint-Laurent, Montreal
 Christ Church Cathedral, Ville-Marie, Montreal
 Christ Church, Beaurepaire, Beaconsfield
 Church of the Epiphany, Verdun, Montreal
 Église de la Nativité, Montréal-Nord, Montreal
 Mile-End Community Mission / Mission Communautaire Mile-End, Le Plateau Mont-Royal, Montreal
 Montreal Diocesan Theological College, Ville-Marie, Montreal
 St Barnabas Church, Pierrefonds-Roxboro, Montreal
 St Cuthbert, St Hilda, & St Luke, Rosemont–La Petite-Patrie, Montreal
 St George, Ville-Marie, Montreal
 St George's Church, Sainte-Anne-de-Bellevue
 St Jax Church, Ville-Marie, Montreal
 St John the Baptist, Pointe-Claire
 St John the Evangelist, Montreal
 St Lawrence Anglican Church, Lasalle, Montreal
 St Mary's Church, Kirkland
 St Matthias' Church - Église St Matthias, Westmount
 St Michael and All Angels, Pierrefonds-Roxboro, Montreal
 St Paul's Anglican Church, Côte-des-Neiges–Notre-Dame-de-Grâce, Montreal
 St Philip's Church, Montreal West
 St Stephen's, Lachine, Montreal
 St Thomas' Anglican Church, Côte-des-Neiges–Notre-Dame-de-Grâce, Montreal
 Ste-Anne's Hospital Chapel, Sainte-Anne-de-Bellevue

Lanaudiere

Les Moulins Regional County Municipality
 Anglican Parish of Mascouche, Mascouche

Matawinie Regional County Municipality
 Christ Church, Rawdon

Laurentides

Argenteuil Regional County Municipality
 Holy Trinity Calumet, Grenville-sur-la-Rouge
 Laurentian Regional Ministry (LRM) - Christ Church, Mille-Isles
 Laurentian Regional Ministry (LRM) - Holy Trinity, Lakefield, Gore
 Laurentian Regional Ministry (LRM) - St Aidan's, Louisa, Wentworth
 Laurentian Regional Ministry (LRM) - St Paul's Church, Dunany, Gore
 Laurentian Regional Ministry - St Simeon's Anglican Church, Lachute
 St Matthew's, Grenville

Deux-Montagnes Regional County Municipality
All Saints Church, Deux-Montagnes

La Rivière-du-Nord Regional County Municipality
 Laurentian Regional Ministry (LRM) - St John the Baptist, Kilkenny, Saint-Hippolyte

Les Laurentides Regional County Municipality
 Laurentian Regional Ministry (LRM) - Grace Anglican Church, Arundel
 Laurentian Regional Ministry (LRM) - Holy Trinity Church, Sainte-Agathe-des-Monts

Les Pays-d'en-Haut Regional County Municipality
 Laurentian Regional Ministry (LRM) - St Francis of the Birds, Saint-Sauveur
 Laurentian Regional Ministry - Trinity Church, Morin-Heights

Thérèse-De Blainville Regional County Municipality
 St James Anglican Church, Rosemère

Laval
 St Simon and Bartholomew, Laval

Montérégie

Brome-Missisquoi Regional County Municipality
 All Saints Anglican Church - Parish of Dunham, Dunham
 Bishop Stewart Memorial Church of the Holy Trinity, Frelighsburg
 Grace Church, Sutton
 Holy Trinity Church, Iron Hill, Brome Lake
 Holy Trinity, South Bolton, West Bolton
 St Aidan's, Sutton
 St James Anglican Church, Bedford
 St James, Foster, Brome Lake
 St James the Apostle, Stanbridge East
 St James the Apostle and Martyr, Farnham
 St James the Lesser, Pigeon Hill, Saint-Armand
 St John the Evangelist, Brome
 St John the Evangelist, Stanbury, Saint-Ignace-de-Stanbridge
 St Paul's, Knowlton, Brome Lake
 St Paul's Anglican Church, Philipsburg, Saint-Armand
 Trinity Church, Cowansville

La Haute-Yamaska Regional County Municipality
 St George, Granby
 St Luke, Waterloo

Le Haut-Richelieu Regional County Municipality
 St George, Clarenceville
 St Thomas, Noyan

Le Haut-Saint-Laurent Regional County Municipality
 St James, Ormstown
 St John's, Huntingdon
 St Luke's, Hemmingford

La Vallée-du-Richelieu Regional County Municipality
 St Martin's House, Otterburn Park
 St Stephen's with St James, Chambly

Pierre-De Saurel Regional County Municipality
 Église Christ Church, Sorel-Tracy

Roussillon Regional County Municipality
 St George's Anglican Church, Châteauguay

Rouville Regional County Municipality
 St Thomas' Anglican Church, Rougemont

Urban agglomeration of Longueuil
 St Barnabas, Saint-Lambert
 St Joseph of Nazareth Church, Brossard
 St Margaret of Antioch, Saint-Hubert, Longueuil
 St Paul's Anglican Church, Greenfield Park, Longueuil
 Trinity Church, Saint-Bruno-de-Montarville

Vaudreuil-Soulanges Regional County Municipality
 St James Church, Parish of Vaudreuil, Hudson
 St Mary's Church, Parish of Vaudreuil, Como, Hudson

Bishops of Montreal
See List of Anglican Bishops of Montreal

See also
 Dean of Montreal

References

Further reading

External links

1850 establishments in Canada
Anglican dioceses established in the 19th century
Christianity in Montreal
Religious organizations established in 1850
Montreal, Anglican Diocese of
Anglican Province of Canada